The Eyserbosweg is a road located in Eys in the south of Limburg, Netherlands. The road is used as a climb in cycling racing and most famously during the Amstel Gold Race, but is also climbed during the Ster Elektrotoer, Hel van het Mergelland, Olympia's Tour, and the Eneco Tour

Amstel Gold Race 
The Eyserbosweg is located at 20 km before the finish of the Cauberg. The climb marks the start of the final and is used by race favourites as one of the hills to place their attacks. It’s part of the section of climbs: Kruisberg (Wahlwiller), Eyserbosweg, Fromberg and Keutenberg. After that the cyclists climb the Cauberg, Geulhemmerberg, and Bemelerberg until the finish.

References 

Climbs in cycle racing in the Netherlands
Amstel Gold Race
Mountains and hills of the Netherlands
Transport in Limburg (Netherlands)
Hills of South Limburg (Netherlands)
Gulpen-Wittem